The 1985 Virginia Slims of Chicago was a women's tennis tournament played on indoor carpet courts at the UIC Pavilion in Chicago, Illinois in the United States and was part of the Category 3 tier of the 1985 WTA Tour. It was the 14th edition of the tournament and was held from September 16 through September 22, 1985. Fifth-seeded Bonnie Gadusek won the singles title and earned $27,000 first-prize money.

Finals

Singles
 Bonnie Gadusek defeated  Kathy Rinaldi 6–1, 6–3
 It was Gadusek's 3rd singles title of the year and the 4th of her career.

Doubles
 Kathy Jordan /  Elizabeth Smylie defeated  Elise Burgin /  JoAnne Russell 6–2, 6–2

References

External links
 International Tennis Federation (ITF) tournament edition details
 Tournament draws

Virginia Slims of Chicago
Ameritech Cup
Virginia Slims of Chicago
Virginia Slims of Chicago
Virginia Slims of Chicago